Bankekind is a locality situated in Linköping Municipality, Östergötland County, Sweden with 405 inhabitants in 2010. Bankekind was earlier called Svinstad (appr. Pigtown) but changed its name because of the pejorative connotations. It is known for its 13th-century church and the beautiful lake Svinstadsjön.

Bankekinds härad (Bankekind Hundred) was a hundred of Östergötland in Sweden.

References 

Populated places in Östergötland County
Populated places in Linköping Municipality